The Florence Y'all Water Tower is a water tower owned by the city of Florence, Kentucky, United States.  It stands between the Florence Mall and interstate highways 75 and 71, where it is seen by millions of interstate motorists annually. The tower, built in 1974 and initially painted with the words FLORENCE MALL in giant letters, became a regional landmark after the M was changed to Y' to address legal concerns.

History
In the early 1970s, the developers of the yet-to-be-built mall gave the land for the tower to the city, stipulating that the words "Florence Mall" be painted on it in view of interstate motorists. The tower would thus advertise the mall, which would open in September 1976.

The tower was built by the Pittsburgh-Des Moines Steel Co. of Pittsburgh, Pennsylvania, and painted in 1974 by the Virginia Erection Co. The giant advertisement immediately raised legal concerns. In July 1974, state Bureau of Highways officials told the city that the tower's sign was illegal because it advertised something which didn't yet exist.

Among the discussed possibilities were repainting the tower or covering the words with a large tarpaulin.  With time running out to comply with the law, civil staff met for a brainstorming session at the Stringtown Restaurant with C.M. "Hop" Ewing, then mayor of Florence, who "sketched different ideas on a napkin". Ewing ultimately devised the idea of removing the vertical lines at the sides of the M in MALL, adding a stem to make it a Y and adding an apostrophe; resulting in "Y'ALL". Ewing called it a "corny solution, but cost-effective", because the minor alteration would cost one-third of a full repainting.  The city paid $472 to the W.T. Marx Company of Cincinnati, Ohio, to make the changes.

The publicity surrounding the Florence Y'all tower advertised the mall better than a passive sign alone. On the mall's opening day in late 1976, mall-goers created a traffic jam at the Kentucky Route 18 exit from I-75.

Further developments
As a general rule, water towers are cleaned about every five years and repainted about every ten. The repaintings of the Florence tower have hidden the original patchwork modification. At some point, the red and white stripes on the tower were extended onto the top, where they converge in a spoke pattern easily visible from aircraft.

The tower's rewritten words have become a local motto of sorts. A town festival held around Labor Day was renamed the "Florence Y'all" fest. The words can be found on lapel pins, bumper stickers, mousepads, postcards, and T-shirts. A local miniature golf course, Florence's World of Golf, features a Florence Y'all replica. The "Soft Play" area in Florence Mall has its own replica tower.

The local independent-league baseball team renamed itself the Florence Y'alls in January 2020, but it had celebrated the tower even during its 16 seasons as the Florence Freedom. The team's mascot is a large inflatable "Y'all Star" mascot; the team has given away Florence Y'all water tower bobblehead dolls. When the Freedom hosted the Frontier League's annual all-star game in 2016, they marketed it as the "Y'All-Star Game", with the water tower in the official logo.

References

External links
 Google Street View of Florence Y'all Water Tower

Appalachian culture
Buildings and structures in Boone County, Kentucky
Individual signs in the United States
Water towers in Kentucky
Towers completed in 1974
1974 establishments in Kentucky
Florence, Kentucky